Jack Burnett Murta,  (born May 13, 1943) is a former Canadian politician.

Born in Carman, Manitoba, the son of John James Murta and Jean (Burnett) Murta, he graduated from the Diploma course in Agriculture at the University of Manitoba in 1964.

In 1970, he was elected to the House of Commons of Canada as a Progressive Conservative in a by-election for the riding of Lisgar following the death of the previous incumbent, George Muir. He was re-elected in 1972, 1974, 1979, 1980, and 1984.

He was Parliamentary Secretary to the President of the Treasury Board in the short lived government of Joe Clark in 1979. In the Brian Mulroney government he was Minister of State (Multiculturalism) from 1984 to 1985 and Minister of State (Tourism) from 1985 to 1986.

References
 
 

1943 births
Living people
Canadian Protestants
Members of the House of Commons of Canada from Manitoba
Progressive Conservative Party of Canada MPs
Members of the King's Privy Council for Canada
People from Carman, Manitoba
Members of the 24th Canadian Ministry